Baguenaudier (French for "time-waster"), also known as the Chinese rings, Cardan's suspension, Cardano's rings, Devil's needle or five pillars puzzle, is a disentanglement puzzle featuring a loop which must be disentangled from a sequence of rings on interlinked pillars. The loop can be either string or a rigid structure.

It is thought to have been invented originally in China. The origins are obscure. The American ethnographer Stewart Culin related a tradition attributing the puzzle's invention to the 2nd/3rd century Chinese general Zhuge Liang. It was used by French peasants as a locking mechanism.

Variations of this include the Devil's staircase, Devil's Halo and the impossible staircase. Another similar puzzle is the Giant's causeway which uses a separate pillar with an embedded ring.

Mathematical solution
The 19th-century French mathematician Édouard Lucas, the inventor of the Tower of Hanoi puzzle, was known to have come up with an elegant solution which used binary and Gray codes, in the same way that his puzzle can be solved. The minimum number of moves to solve an n-ringed problem has been found to be

 

For other formulae, see .

See also
ABACABA pattern
Disentanglement puzzle
Towers of Hanoi

References

Chinese ancient games
Chinese inventions
Educational toys
Mechanical puzzles